The Nolichucky River is a  river that flows through Western North Carolina and East Tennessee, in the southeastern United States.  Traversing the Pisgah National Forest and the Cherokee National Forest in the Blue Ridge Mountains, the river's watershed is home to some of the highest mountains in the Appalachians, including Mount Mitchell in North Carolina, the highest point in the eastern United States. The river is a tributary of the French Broad River, and is impounded by Nolichucky Dam near Greeneville, Tennessee.

Hydrography
The Nolichucky River rises as the confluence of the North Toe River and the Cane River near the community of Huntdale, North Carolina. The stream succeeds the North Toe as the boundary between Yancey County and Mitchell County, North Carolina.  Trending roughly westward, it flows along the northern base of Flattop Mountain. The gorge is especially steep on its north side. Geologically, the area is predominantly underlain by metamorphic rock of Precambrian age.

The river then enters Unicoi County, Tennessee, as it drops through a whitewater gorge, flowing between the ranges of the Bald Mountains (to the south) and the Unaka Mountains (to the north). Turning northwest, the stream is bridged by the Appalachian Trail, and then, just beyond this, by U.S. Highway 19W southwest of Erwin, Tennessee.  Near Erwin, two tributary streams, South Indian Creek and North Indian Creek, join the Nolichucky River. Turning more to the north, the stream is paralleled for several miles by State Route 81, (which is also concurrent with Tennessee State Route 107 for several miles) crossing into Washington County. The river cuts between several mountains at this point, including Rich Mountain to the south and Buffalo Mountain to the north.

Shortly after entering Washington County, the river makes a horseshoe bend near Embreeville, where it is bridged by Tennessee 81 and Tennessee 107 for the first time. At the northeastern end of Embreeville Mountain, the stream emerges from a large gap, and, turning west-southwest, is bridged by Tennessee 81 again. Here, it exits the Blue Ridge Mountains and enters the Ridge and Valley province, which is underlain primarily by sedimentary rock of the Lower Paleozoic Era. The river then continues west-southwest for several miles, paralleled by State Route 107.  The river leaves the roadside near Mt. Carmel. From there it flows northwest over a winding course to Davy Crockett Birthplace State Park near the Washington County–Greene County line. Many tributary creeks join the river in Washington and Greene counties.  At the county line, one of the larger tributaries, Big Limestone Creek, joins the river. State Route 351 crosses the river west of Crockett's birthplace.

From Crockett's birthplace the river flows southwestward, following the trends of the Ridge and Valley province's underlying geology. Bridged by Tennessee 107 again just east of Tusculum, the stream continues southwestward, later bridged by State Route 350 just above an impoundment caused by Nolichucky Dam. This dam was constructed as a hydroelectric project by the former Tennessee Electric Power Company in 1912. The dam was sold to the Tennessee Valley Authority (TVA) in 1939, when the agency was established by the Franklin D. Roosevelt administration during the Great Depression. 

The TVA continued to operate the dam for electrical power purposes until the 1970s. The degree of siltation of the reservoir, called Davy Crockett Lake, had made continued efforts to operate the facility for hydroelectric purposes impracticable. The agency retired the dam as a power source but continues to maintain it and to use it for flood control and recreational purposes. Just west of the dam, the river crosses State Route 70 and State Route 107 for a third and final time.

Continuing almost due west, the river is bridged by U.S. Highway 321. Just before reaching the Greene County–Cocke County line, the river is bridged by State Route 340. Just past this point, the river becomes the border between the counties. A few miles below this point it is bridged by Knob Creek Road, a Cocke County road.  South of Interstate 81, Greene , Cocke, and Hamblen counties come to a point at a bend in river, where Lick Creek joins the river. From this point on, the meandering stream forms the Hamblen County–Cocke County line.

The confluence of the Nolichucky with the French Broad River occurs in the upstream portion of the Douglas Lake impoundment, caused by Douglas Dam, a World War II-era TVA project located downstream along the French Broad. The mouth of the Nolichucky lies near the point where Hamblen, Cocke, and Jefferson counties meet. Near the mouth is the Rankin Wildlife Management Area, a reserve operated by the Tennessee Wildlife Resources Agency.

History
While the origins of the name-place have long been debated and remain unclear, it is believed to be derived from the name of the Cherokee village Na’na-tlu gun’yi, or "Spruce-Tree Place," that once stood near modern Jonesborough, Tennessee.  Others argue that, according to local lore, it actually means "Rushing Water(s)", "Dangerous Water(s)", or "Black Swirling Water".

During the 1770s, European frontiersmen established the "Nolichucky settlements" along the river in modern Greene County, Tennessee, in what was then part of Cherokee territory.  These settlements were aligned with the Watauga settlements in what is now Elizabethton, Tennessee.  As hostilities intensified in the mid-1770s between the settlers and a faction of the Cherokee, known as the "Chickamaugas," who were opposed to the settlements, John Sevier, at the time a young militia officer, began overseeing the construction of Fort Lee.  After an invasion was launched by Chickamauga leader Dragging Canoe in July 1776, Sevier abandoned the unfinished fort and fled to the Watauga settlements.  Sevier would later acquire the nickname "Nolichucky Jack," or "Chucky Jack," for his exploits along the river and in its vicinity.
 
Famed frontiersman Davy Crockett was born along the river near Limestone, Tennessee, in 1786.  The site is now the focus of Davy Crockett Birthplace State Park.

The turn of the century brought trains hauling passengers (until 1955) and mostly coal on the Clinchfield Railroad (now operated by CSX), which still runs alongside the river through the gorge with bridged crossings at Unaka Springs (Erwin, Tennessee) and Poplar, North Carolina. At least one sunken railcar sits at the bottom of the river near the entrance to the Lost Cove Settlement, a civil-war era ghost town just upriver (and uphill) from the once-disputed Tennessee-North Carolina border.

Whitewater rafting
Between Poplar, North Carolina, and Unaka Springs, Tennessee, the Nolichucky River Gorge provides one of the more scenic and technical whitewater trips in the Southern United States, due in large part to its constant (and often rapid) fluctuations.

The naturally flowing Nolichucky River is a popular whitewater rafting and canoeing destination having stretches of both whitewater areas and calm water. Rainfall upstream around Mount Mitchell makes the upper section rapids ever more impressive with significant rain causing extremely big water and un-runnable routes in otherwise ordinary areas.

"Frank Gentry describes such a trip through the gorge with Bob Lawson on a rubber raft. Frank says, 'I just went along for the ride and a look at the scenery. Man-a-live, I didn't have time to look at anything! When that raft hit those rapids at "Rooster Tail" we were going round and round, dived into "Souse Hole", slammed into rocks here and more rocks there. Seemed like the harder you paddled the more rocks you'd hit. You'd just whirl and twirl and wham into more big boulders you hadn't even seen. Sometimes that white-faced water would stand straight up and slam you smack-kadab all over the raft, or out of it. Man, that was a wild trip!"

Inversely, a lack of adequate rainfall throughout the summer considerably increases the difficulty of navigating the pre-existing aspects of the rapids, which already tend towards being both technically difficult and challenging for rafters.  These unusually dry conditions and concomitant low water levels reveal a vast diversity of hitherto unseen features.  These hazards are ordinarily submerged during summers with normal seasonal rainfall patterns, and the associated lower water levels

Seasonal droughts can make rafting trips inadvisable or simply impassable (nothing's impossible), prompting local rafting companies in Unicoi County to sometimes divert whitewater river trips to the Watauga River running through Elizabethton, Tennessee in Carter County.  The Tennessee Valley Authority  (TVA) regulates flow of the Watauga River and guarantees a minimum release schedule accommodating whitewater rafting companies during the summer season with the regular release of deep, impounded reservoir waters from behind both the Watauga Dam and the Wilbur Dam.

See also
Conway Bridge, one of its crossings
List of North Carolina rivers
List of Tennessee rivers

References

External links
River flow data (USGS)
American Whitewater reach description
Middle Nolichucky Watershed Alliance

Tributaries of the French Broad River
Rivers of North Carolina
Rivers of Tennessee
Rivers of Yancey County, North Carolina
Rivers of Mitchell County, North Carolina
Rivers of Unicoi County, Tennessee
Rivers of Washington County, Tennessee
Rivers of Greene County, Tennessee
Rivers of Hamblen County, Tennessee
Rivers of Cocke County, Tennessee